Zavolzhsky is a rural locality (a settlement) in Berezhnovskoye Rural Settlement, Nikolayevsky District, Volgograd Oblast, Russia. The population was 105 as of 2010.

Geography 
Zavolzhsky is located 55 km northeast of Nikolayevsk (the district's administrative centre) by road. Berezhnovka is the nearest rural locality.

References 

Rural localities in Nikolayevsky District, Volgograd Oblast